The Phantom Planet is a 1961 independently made American black-and-white science fiction film, produced by Fred Gebhardt, directed by William Marshall, that stars Dean Fredericks, Coleen Gray, Anthony Dexter, and Francis X. Bushman. The film was released in the U.S. by American International Pictures as a double feature with Assignment Outer Space.

This film was featured in Mystery Science Theater 3000, Season 9 (1998) Episode 2.

Plot

It is 1980, and the United States Air Force's Space Exploration Wing has bases on the Moon and on the eve of a mission to Mars. When another of its two-member crewed Pegasus spacecraft mysteriously disappears, rumors begin circulating of space monsters and phantom planets. Captain Frank Chapman and his navigator Lt. Ray Makonnen are ordered to investigate.

During the search, their spaceship suffers damage from a meteor shower, requiring that both men go outside to make repairs. A bullet-sized particle, however, pierces the air hose on Chapman's space suit, rendering him unconscious. Makonnen is able to repair the hose, but as he opens the airlock hatch, he is fatally struck by a similar particle. Makonnen's last act before being propelled into deep space is to push Chapman inside and close the airlock hatch. Chapman comes to and finds Makonnen gone and himself unable to communicate with the lunar base. He records a log entry about the preceding events, noting that he now must make a forced landing on an asteroid, that it is somehow pulling in his Pegasus spaceship.

Exiting his ship while still feeling the effects of the accident, Chapman collapses and sees tiny humanoids about six inches tall approaching. Once his helmet visor is opened, he can breathe but shrinks to their size due to the asteroid's atmosphere. He is taken underground.

Sesom, the aged and wise ruler of Rheton (the native name for the rocky and seemingly lifeless planetoid where Chapman has landed), explains that though his craft was brought down safely by their gravitational tractor beam, they had not been able to do the same with the preceding Earth spaceships that came near, which were completely destroyed, along with their crews, when they crashed on Rheton's surface. He informs Chapman that he never can leave but will have all the rights of a citizen of Rheton. As he slept, Chapman's spaceship was sent into space to keep Rheton's existence a secret, and more importantly, their world's gravitational technology, which allows the Rhetonians to navigate their world through space.

Chapman meets two beautiful women: Sesom's smugly spoiled blond daughter Liara and the gentle but mute black-haired Zetha. Liara is more than willing to answer his many questions about Rheton. Sesom informs Chapman that he later may marry one of the women once he has become accustomed to living on Rheton.

Liara, after following and engaging constantly with Chapman, declares her love for him, but Chapman, still eager to return to his own people, quietly rejects her. Herron, a young man who is in love with Liara, attempts to win her for himself by lying to Sesom, telling him Chapman is attempting to win over both women.

Stating that he believes this to be a crime against the people of Rheton, Herron requests a duel to the death. Chapman agrees, and the two engage in a form of combat where opponents must push each other onto gravity plates that cause immediate disintegration when touched. Just as Chapman is about to push Herron onto a plate, he lets Herron go, stating that he cannot kill someone for no reason.

As time goes on, Chapman and the mute Zetha become acquainted and eventually fall in love. Herron comes to Chapman late one night and offers to help him escape.

Any plans for the future, however, are put on hold when Chapman discovers the reason for Rheton's erratic course through space: It is because the planetoid is being attacked by the Solarites, an alien race of "fire people" from an unidentified "sun satellite". They want to destroy Rheton with their flaming fighter craft so they can steal its secret of gravitational control.

With Chapman's help, Sesom and Herron destroy the enemy fleet using a gravity beam. During the battle, a giant 7-inch tall Solarite prisoner, captured during a previous raid, escapes when the gravity barrier holding him fails. Stalking corridors, the creature captures Zetha, who previously had been traumatized into silence by a childhood encounter with the savage species. After Sesom is attacked by this bug-eyed monster, Chapman and Herron attempt to rescue Zetha. Chapman defeats the Solarite by pushing it onto a gravity plate.

While kidnapped, Zetha's muteness vanished when she saw Chapman about to be attacked by the creature, and she was able to scream, warning him. The return of her voice allows her to later confess her love for him. The two kiss, but Zetha knows that he must return to his home world. They are interrupted when a search party from Earth locates Chapman. In order to preserve the secret of his adopted people, Chapman crawls inside his spacesuit, and after once more being exposed to atmospheric gases from Earth, he returns to his normal size. Reluctantly, he goes with the search party, leaving Zetha and the miniature world of Rheton behind.

Cast

 Dean Fredericks as Capt. Frank Chapman
 Coleen Gray as Liara
 Anthony Dexter as Herron
 Francis X. Bushman as Sessom
 Jimmy Weldon as Lt. Webb
 Dolores Faith as Zetha
 Richard Weber as Lt. Ray Makonnen
 Al Jarvis as Judge Eden
 Dick Haynes as Col. Lansfield
 Earl McDaniels as Capt. Leonard
 Mike Marshall as Lt. White
 Richard Kiel as The Solarite
 Merissa Mathes as Juror

Production
Director William Marshall, a former actor and bandleader, previously had made two films with Errol Flynn, Hello God and Adventures of Captain Fabian. His son Mike Marshall made his debut in The Phantom Planet. Screenwriter and co-producer Fred Gebhardt previously produced and wrote the screenplay for Columbia Pictures 1960 science fiction film 12 to the Moon. Star Dean Fredericks had just finished filming the lead in the NBC TV series Steve Canyon which was later cancelled after its first season of 34 episodes. Co-star Francis X. Bushman had been a major film star in silent films. This was actor Richard Kiel's first credited film role; he played the captured Solarite.

The Phantom Planets interior spaceship sets, spacesuit helmets and oxygen backpacks, and special effects originally appeared in the Ziv Company's science fiction television series Men into Space, broadcast in 1959 on CBS TV.

Home video
 The Phantom Planet has received multiple DVD "bargain bin" releases as a result of being in the public domain.
 The Mystery Science Theater 3000 version of the film was released on DVD by Rhino Home Video as part of its Collection, Volume 8 set.
 A colorized version of The Phantom Planet was released by Legend Films.
 A restored widescreen version, remastered from a 35mm print, was released December 10, 2017 on BD-R by Snappy Video, an imprint of Thunderbean Animation.

Legacy
The film was adapted into a comic with some minor plot changes.

The movie was featured in a season nine episode of Mystery Science Theater 3000.

Footage from the film was used in a 2010 advertising campaign for La Quinta Inns and Suites, an American hotel chain.

The rock group Phantom Planet took their name from the film.

See also
 List of American films of 1961
 List of films in the public domain in the United States
 List of films featuring miniature people

References

Bibliography
 Warren, Bill. Keep Watching the Skies: American Science Fiction Films of the Fifties, 21st Century Edition. Jefferson, North Carolina: McFarland & Company, 2009, (First Edition 1982). .

External links

 
 
 
 
 
 
 
 

1961 films
1960s science fiction films
American science fiction films
American International Pictures films
American black-and-white films
Articles containing video clips
1960s English-language films
Films about astronauts
Films set in 1980
Films set in the future
American independent films
1960s monster movies
Films about size change
Films adapted into comics
American monster movies
1961 independent films
1960s American films